A breed is a group of domestic animals with a homogeneous appearance, behavior, and other characteristics that distinguish it from other animals of the same species.

Breed may also refer to:

 Breed (surname)
 "Breed" (song), a song by Nirvana on the album Nevermind
 Breed (video game), by Brat Designs
 Breed (comics), the title of two limited series of comic books, written and drawn by Jim Starlin
 Breed Motorcycle Club, an outlaw motorcycle club
Half-breed, a White/Native American person
In gay slang, anorectal ejaculation

Places
 Breed, Wisconsin, United States, a town
 Breed (community), Wisconsin, an unincorporated community
 Breeds, Essex, England

See also 
 Breeder (disambiguation)
 Breeding (disambiguation)
 The Breed (disambiguation)